Trenidad Aviel Hubbard (born Trent Hubbard, May 11, 1964) is a former Major League Baseball journeyman outfielder. He is an alumnus of Southern University and A&M College.

Drafted by the Houston Astros in the 12th round of the 1986 MLB amateur draft, Hubbard made his major league debut with the Colorado Rockies on July 7, 1994 at age 30. He had two plate appearances for the Rockies in the 1995 National League division playoffs.

After signing with the Los Angeles Dodgers as a free agent on Dec. 3, 1997, Hubbard had his best season in the majors. Appearing in 94 games, he hit .298 with nine stolen bases and seven home runs.

He finished his MLB career with 196 hits and a batting average of .257.

Spending parts of 19 seasons in the minor leagues, Hubbard put up some impressive numbers with 1,864 hits in the minors and a batting average of .302.

Hubbard last played professional baseball in 2005, when he split the season among three class AAA teams, the Durham Bulls, Round Rock Express, and Iowa Cubs. He is a graduate of South Shore High School in Chicago.

External links

Retrosheet
Mexican League statistics
Pura Pelota Venezuelan Professional Baseball League statistics

1966 births
Living people
African-American baseball players
Albuquerque Dukes players
American expatriate baseball players in Mexico
Asheville Tourists players
Atlanta Braves players
Auburn Astros players
Baltimore Orioles players
Baseball players from Chicago
Buffalo Bisons (minor league) players
Caribes de Oriente players
American expatriate baseball players in Venezuela
Chicago Cubs players
Cleveland Indians players
Colorado Rockies players
Colorado Springs Sky Sox players
Columbus Mudcats players
Durham Bulls players
Guerreros de Oaxaca players
Iowa Cubs players
Jackson Generals (Texas League) players
Kansas City Royals players
Los Angeles Dodgers players
Major League Baseball left fielders
Major League Baseball center fielders
Mexican League baseball players
Omaha Royals players
Osceola Astros players
Baseball players from Atlanta
Baseball players from Houston
Portland Beavers players
Round Rock Express players
San Diego Padres players
San Francisco Giants players
Southern Jaguars baseball players
Tucson Toros players
21st-century African-American people
20th-century African-American sportspeople